"The Rare Ould Times" is a song composed by Pete St. John in the 1970s for the Dublin City Ramblers. It is sometimes called "Dublin in the Rare Ould Times", "The Rare Old Times", or "The Rare Auld Times".

Description
In the song, the narrator, Sean Dempsey, who comes from Pimlico, a working-class neighbourhood in the Dublin Liberties, recalls his upbringing. He laments the changes that have occurred in the city since his youth, mentioning the loss of Nelson's Pillar, the Metropole ballroom, the "Royal" (Theatre Royal). He dislikes the "new glass cages", the modern office blocks and flats being erected along the quays, and says farewell to Anna Liffey (the River Liffey).

Recording history
The song was first recorded by the Dublin City Ramblers, who released it as a single in 1977. It has since been recorded by dozens of artists such as The Dubliners, the Irish Tenors, Paddy Reilly, The High Kings, Flogging Molly, Nathan Carter, Damien Dempsey and Kodaline. It was a number 1 hit in the Irish charts for Danny Doyle in January 1978.

The song remains popular in Ireland, particularly in Dublin. It is sung as a sporting anthem by fans of Dublin GAA teams.

Irish businessman Bill Cullen used the first two stanzas of the song as the epigraph for his 2004 memoir of growing up in inner-city Dublin, It's a Long Way from Penny Apples.

References 

Songs about Ireland
Music in Dublin (city)
Songs about nostalgia
Songs written by Pete St. John
The Dubliners songs
Flogging Molly songs